Gérard Pasquier (1 February 1929 – 11 March 1995) was a French alpine skier and curler. As an alpine skier he competed in two events at the 1956 Winter Olympics.

Curling teams

References

External links

1929 births
1995 deaths
French male alpine skiers
Olympic alpine skiers of France
Alpine skiers at the 1956 Winter Olympics
Sportspeople from Haute-Savoie
French male curlers